

QI03A Goat

QI03AA Inactivated viral vaccines
Empty group

QI03AB Inactivated bacterial vaccines (including mycoplasma, toxoid and chlamydia)
QI03AB01 Mycobacterium

QI03AC Inactivated bacterial vaccines and antisera
Empty group

QI03AD Live viral vaccines
QI03AD01 Peste des petits ruminants (PPR)

QI03AE Live bacterial vaccines
QI03AE01 Mycobacterium

QI03AF Live bacterial and viral vaccines
Empty group

QI03AG Live and inactivated bacterial vaccines
Empty group

QI03AH Live and inactivated viral vaccines
Empty group

QI03AI Live viral and inactivated bacterial vaccines
Empty group

QI03AJ Live and inactivated viral and bacterial vaccines
Empty group

QI03AK Inactivated viral and live bacterial vaccines
Empty group

QI03AL Inactivated viral and inactivated bacterial vaccines
Empty group

QI03AM Antisera, immunoglobulin preparations, and antitoxins
Empty group

QI03AN Live parasitic vaccines
Empty group

QI03AO Inactivated parasitic vaccines
Empty group

QI03AP Live fungal vaccines
Empty group

QI03AQ Inactivated fungal vaccines
Empty group

QI03AR In vivo diagnostic preparations
Empty group

QI03AS Allergens
Empty group

QI03AT Colostrum preparations and substitutes
Empty group

QI03AU Other live vaccines
Empty group

QI03AV Other inactivated vaccines
Empty group

QI03AX Other immunologicals
Empty group

QI03X Capridae, others
Empty group

Notes

References

I03